Transverse may refer to:

Transverse engine, an engine in which the crankshaft is oriented side-to-side relative to the wheels of the vehicle
Transverse flute, a flute that is held horizontally
Transverse force (or Euler force), the tangential force that is felt in reaction to any angular acceleration
Transverse mass, a particle physics quantity
Transverse plane, the plane orthogonal to the anteroposterior or oral-aboral axis
Transverse rotors, a type of rotorcraft in which there are two rotors mounted side by side
Transverse wave, a wave that causes a disturbance in the medium perpendicular to the direction it advances
Transverse Island, an island on the east side of Stefansson Bay, off the coast of Enderby Land

See also 
Transversal (disambiguation)
Transversality (disambiguation)